Andrey Zvezdzin (born 17 July 1986) is a retired Belarusian footballer.

Honours
Dinamo Brest
Belarusian Cup winner: 2006–07

External links
 

1986 births
Living people
Belarusian footballers
Association football goalkeepers
FC RUOR Minsk players
FC Dinamo Minsk players
FC Dinamo-Juni Minsk players
FC Dynamo Brest players
FC Granit Mikashevichi players
FC Khimik Svetlogorsk players
People from Dobruš District
Sportspeople from Gomel Region